Greatest Hits Vol. 1 is the first album by the band Cockney Rejects released in 1980. Despite the title, it is not a greatest hits compilation album.

Track listing 
All songs by "Stinky" Turner, Mick Geggus and Vince Riordan unless otherwise noted.
 "I'm Not a Fool" - 3:49 (Turner, Geggus, Riordan, Scott)
 "Headbanger" - 1:28
 "Bad Man" - 2:37
 "Fighting in the Street" - 2:37
 "Shitter" - 1:53
 "Here They Come Again" - 2:47
 "Join the Rejects" - 2:43
 "East End" - 2:14 (Turner, Geggus)
 "The New Song" - 2:28
 "Police Car" - 1:58 (Turner, Geggus)
 "Someone Like You" - 2:54
 "They're Gonna Put Me Away" - 1:18
 "Are You Ready to Ruck" - 2:19
 "Where the Hell Is Babylon" - 2:26

Personnel
Cockney Rejects
Stinky Turner - vocals 
Mick Geggus - guitar, vocals
Vince Riordan - bass, vocals
Andy Scott - drums

References

1980 debut albums
Cockney Rejects albums
EMI Records albums